Amjad Ali Khan (born 8 October 1972) is a Pakistani politician who had been a member of the National Assembly of Pakistan from August 2018 till January 2023. Previously he was a member of the National Assembly from June 2013 to May 2018.
He had been elected as District Naib Nazim during Military Dictator Gen Musharraf Period for 4 Years and Later he had been elected as Mianwali City Tehsil Nazim also.

Early life
He was born on 8 October 1972.

Political career
He was elected to the National Assembly of Pakistan as a candidate of Pakistan Tehreek-e-Insaf (PTI) from Constituency NA-72 (Mianwali-II) in 2013 Pakistani general election. He received 126,088 votes and defeated Humair Hayat Khan Rokhri.

He was re-elected to the National Assembly as a candidate of PTI from Constituency NA-96 (Mianwali-II) in 2018 Pakistani general election.

On 13 February 2019, he was elected as the Chairman of the Standing Committee of the National Assembly of Pakistan on Defence.

Occasionally, he acts as the Chairman of the assembly sessions of the National Assembly when Speaker and Deputy Speaker are not present in the sessions.

References

External Link

More Reading
 List of members of the 15th National Assembly of Pakistan

Living people
Pakistan Tehreek-e-Insaf politicians
Punjabi people
Pakistani MNAs 2013–2018
1972 births
Pakistani MNAs 2018–2023